For main article please see: AFL Army Award
 
The Australian Football League celebrates the best act of selflessness or one percenter of the season through the annual AFL Army Award competition.

Winners by round
Legend
 Winner of round in BLUE

 *Denotes current Round

See also
 AFL Army Award
 2007 AFL Goal of the Year
 2007 AFL Mark of the Year
 2007 AFL Season

External links
 AFL Army Award

Australian Football League Awards Seasons Voting
AFL Army Award
Australian rules football-related lists